The V-class ferries, also known as the Victoria class, originally included seven ferries operated by BC Ferries built between 1962 and 1965. The V class were a continuation of the previous  design with some cosmetic changes and different engines. Four of these vessels underwent vehicle capacity increases three times. The lead ship of the class, Queen of Victoria suffered significant damage in a collision in 1970.

The vessels began to be retired in 2000. Four vessels were to be retired and sold in 2008. The transfer of Queen of Esquimalt was halted and she was broken up in Ensenada, Mexico. Both Queen of Nanaimo and Queen of Burnaby were retired in 2017. Queen of New Westminster is still in service with BC Ferries. Queen of Nanaimo was sold to a ferry company in Fiji and remains in service there.

Background
In 1958, the premier of British Columbia W.A.C. Bennett authorised the creation of a provincial ferry service. The new service, known as the British Columbia Ferry Corporation ordered two ships constructed from shipyards in British Columbia which became the  ferries. The initial success of the first two led BC Ferries to order a further two new ships similar to the Sidney class, but with modifications based on lessons learned from the first two ships. The new ships would be also be designed by the naval architect Philip F. Spaulding and his Canadian partner Arthur McLaren but this time, BC Ferries would purchase the plans for the ships and not have to pay royalty payments. Ordered in 1961, the two new ships were initially named City of Victoria and City of Vancouver. The vessels were renamed to Queen of Victoria and Queen of Vancouver due to a change in fleetwide naming policy based on CP Ships naming their vessels "Princess". As a result, the larger vessels of the British Columbia Ferries fleet would have "Queen" placed in front of their original names and the smaller ones have it added to the end. The V class were intended to replace the ships BC Ferries had received from the Black Ball Line during its creation.

Ships in class

Description

As originally built, the vessels were of similar designs but with different engines. The ships of the class were built in three batches. The Paxman engines were cheaper to acquire than the Mirlees diesels in the preceding Sidney class. The first batch had a 106-car capacity and mainly cosmetic differences from the Sidney class, though the class was designed with future expansion in mind.

The Paxman engines in the first batch had proved to be problematic, so BC Ferries had Fairbanks-Morse diesel engines installed in these two with no difference in speed. The second batch had an original car capacity of 145 and could transport 1,000 passengers. 

The final batch of three, Queen of Burnaby, Queen of Nanaimo and Queen of New Westminster returned to the Mirless diesels of the Sidney class as the Fairbanks-Morse engines turned out to be just as problematic as the Paxmans.

Modifications

The seven ships were modified twice in quick succession to increase vehicle capacity. The first refit was the installation of ramps and platform car decks in 1968 that increased car capacity in 1968. The second beginning in 1971 saw the ships sliced in half vertically across the beam for the insertion of a new  midsection, which dramatically increased their capacity. Beyond increasing the length of the ships, a new deluxe restaurant was added seating 48 persons, a 190-seat self-service cafeteria was installed, carpets and wall paneling and an open solarium was to the boat deck. The new midsections were pre-constructed to limit the time the ferries were out of service, turning it into a roughly three-month refit. During the refit, 129 hydraulic jacks were welded into place and were used to open the ship up for the midsections to be slid into place.

The first batch now had capacity for 192 cars and 1,250 passengers. Their Paxman twin diesels created  and a speed of 18 knots. They had a crew of 55. Their Fairbanks-Morse diesels created  and they retained their 18-knot speed. The third batch's Mirlees diesels created  and the ships varied in size, with all ships retaining the 4.0 m draught, and similar capacity with the first two batches.

Beginning in 1981, the first four of the seven ships were cut horizontally from bow to stern to have a new vehicle deck inserted. These rebuilt ships retained the V-class designation. Car capacity increased to 400 for Queen of Esquimalt and Queen of Saanich, while Queen of Vancouver and Queen of Victoria increased to 284, as they retained extra room for overheight vehicles. During this refit, the ships all received new MaK diesel engines to replace the problematic Paxman and Fairbanks-Morse models.

Queen of Burnaby and Queen of Nanaimo were two original ships without the new car deck; they received a new designation as  vessels. Queen of New Westminster was lifted in 1991 and was fit with new Wartsila 9R-32D diesel engines to travel at  comparable to the newer  ferries. She had a major refit of her passenger areas completed in 2009, preparing her for another ten to fifteen years of service.

Service history

Queen of Vancouver and Queen of Victoria entered service in 1962. They were followed by Queen of Saanich and Queen of Esquimalt. The vessels served on the Tsawwassen – Swartz Bay route. Queen of Nanaimo, Queen of New Westminster and Queen of Burnaby were the last to enter service and operated on the Departure Bay  – Horseshoe Bay route. Queen of New Westminster remains in service.

On 2 August 1970, Queen of Victoria was in transit through Active Pass with 626 passengers when the ferry was struck by the Soviet freighter Sergey Yesenin. Three passengers were killed in the incident and Queen of Victoria suffered significant damage, with the Soviet ship suffering minor damage. The results of the investigation found that the pilot aboard Sergey Yesenin was mainly at fault, though the master of Queen of Victoria was not spared blame. Queen of Victoria was towed back to port. 

In 1992, while Queen of New Westminster was loading passengers and vehicles at Departure Bay, a van was directed to stop on the apron of the shore loading ramp to the upper deck of the ship. While the van was stopped, the ship began to depart, leaving the apron without support and causing the van to fall first onto Queen of New Westminsters deck and then into the water. Three people died in the incident, with three survivors (one suffering serious injury). BC Ferries was later found to be at fault in the following investigation.

In 1994 Queen of Burnaby was transferred to the Victorian Line and renamed Royal Victorian. In 1997, the ship was renamed Princess Marguerite III in 1997 before returning to BC Ferries ownership in 2000. Upon return to the BC Ferries fleet, the ship resumed using her initial name.

Queen of Victoria was the first to be retired in 2001. The ship was sold to R & G Importadora & Exportadora of the Dominican Republic. and renamed Queen of Ocoa. Queen of Ocoa was scrapped in 2006 at Alang, India. 

Queen of Esquimalt was retired on 25 May 2008. The vessel was sold to Dalian Golden Sun I/E Co., Ltd. and docked in Port Alberni and renamed Princess Jacqueline. The ship was intended for further service in China, but Princess Jacqueline never left British Columbia waters and the sale was eventually halted due to court action. In 2011 the vessel was scrapped at Ensenada, Mexico.

Queen of Saanich was retired on 18 November 2008 and sold. The vessel was renamed Owen Bell and used as a logging camp on the coast of the Vancouver Island. The ship was later moved to be moored on the west side of Anvil Island in Howe Sound. Owen Bell was scrapped in 2012 at Ensenada, Mexico. Queen of Vancouver was the next to be taken out of service on 15 April 2009. The ferry was sold to Coast Marine and moored at Woodfibre until 2012. The ship was then sent for scrapping at Ensenada, Mexico.

Queen of Burnaby was retired in May 2017 (replaced by MV Salish Orca) and Queen of Nanaimo was retired in September 2017 (replaced by MV Salish Eagle). Queen of Nanaimo was sold to Goundar Shipping Ltd. of Fiji for service in the island nation. The ship was renamed Lomaiviti Princess V and services Savusavu and Kadavu Island. In June 2022, the ship was sold for scrap to a breaking yard in Alang, India. Queen of Burnaby was no longer fit for sailing and was sold in 2018 on the condition that it be kept moored or scrapped. However, the sale was not finalized and the vessel remains in Union Bay, British Columbia.

Notes

Citations

References

External links
 Film footage of the August 2nd 1970 collision between the Queen of Victoria and the Soviet freighter Sergey Yesenin

 
Ships built in British Columbia
Ferry classes